Good Woman is the third studio album by American singer Gladys Knight. It was released by MCA Records in 1991 in the United States. The album was nominated for the Grammy Award for Best Female R&B Vocal Performance at the 34th awards ceremony, while	their rendition of "Superwoman" Knight, Dionne Warwick and Patti LaBelle a nomination in the Best R&B Performance by a Duo or Group with Vocal category.

Critical reception

AllMusic editor Alex Henderson wrote that "like her final recordings with the Pips, Good Woman found Knight taking an urban contemporary-oriented approach without sacrificing her artistic integrity. The highly infectious single "Men" is an absolute gem, and cuts ranging from the smooth "This Is Love" to the gritty new jack swing number "Meet Me In the Middle" are definitely the work of an artist being true to herself. Some may find it hard to imagine Knight embracing new jack swing, but in fact, she does so convincingly. Though a few of the cuts aren't very memorable, this is a CD that the veteran singer can, for the most part, be proud of."

Track listing 

Notes
"In This Life" is omitted from the vinyl release due to space issues.

Charts

Weekly charts

Year-end charts

Release history

References 

Gladys Knight albums
1991 albums
MCA Records albums
Albums produced by Michael J. Powell